Romy Tarangul (born 19 October 1987 in Frankfurt (Oder)) is a German judoka. She currently competes in the -52 kg category for the JC 90 Frankfurt (Oder).

In 2008, Tarangul won the silver medal at the European Championships. With this result Tarangul qualified for the Beijing Olympics, where she reached a 9th place overall. After winning her first bout against Uzbek Sinura Djuraeva she lost narrowly to Misato Nakamura of Japan in the round of 16 and then to Ilse Heylen of Belgium in the repechage round.

Tarangul posed nude in the German edition of Playboy in August 2008, alongside compatriots Nicole Reinhardt, Katharina Scholz and Petra Niemann.

At the 2009 World Judo Championships Tarangul won the Bronze medal in her category, marking her biggest international success so far.

At the 2012 Summer Olympics in London Tarangul won her first round fight against Natalia Kuziutina. She was eliminated in the quarterfinals after being defeated by Rosalba Forciniti of Italy who later won the bronze medal.

References

External links
 
 
 

1987 births
Living people
German female judoka
Olympic judoka of Germany
Judoka at the 2008 Summer Olympics
Judoka at the 2012 Summer Olympics
German people of Romanian descent
Universiade medalists in judo
Universiade bronze medalists for Germany
Medalists at the 2013 Summer Universiade
Sportspeople from Frankfurt (Oder)
21st-century German women